Obelus is a European genus of small air-breathing land snails, terrestrial pulmonate gastropod mollusks in the subfamily Geomitrinae of the family Geomitridae, the hairy snails and their allies.

Species
Species within the genus Obelus include:
 Obelus despreauxii (d'Orbigny, 1839)
 Obelus discogranulatus M. R. Alonso & Groh, 2003
 Obelus mirandae (R. T. Lowe, 1861)
 Obelus moderatus (Mousson, 1857)
 Obelus moratus (Mousson, 1872)
 Obelus pumilio (Dillwyn, 1817)
 Obelus zarzaensis Neiber, Walther, Santana, M. R. Alonso & Ibáñez, 2016
Synonym
 Obelus philamnius (Bourguignat, 1863): synonyym of Xerocrassa philamnia (Bourguignat, 1863) (superseded combination)

References

 Bank, R. A. (2017). Classification of the Recent terrestrial Gastropoda of the World. Last update: July 16, 2017
 Ibáñez, M., Alonso, M.R., Groh, K. & Hutterer, R. (2003). The Genus Obelus Hartmann, 1842 (Gastropoda, Pulmonata, Helicoidea) and its Phylogenetic Relationships. Zoologischer Anzeiger, 242: 157-167.

External links
 Nomenclator Zoologicus info
Hartmann, J.D.W. (1840-1844). Erd- und Süsswasser-Gasteropoden der Schweiz. Mit Zugabe einiger merkwürdigen exotischen Arten, i-xx, 1-36